Yinzhou District may refer to the following locations in China:

Yinzhou District, Tieling, Liaoning
Yinzhou District, Ningbo, Zhejiang